The 2008 LSU Tigers football team represented Louisiana State University in the 2008 NCAA Division I FBS football season. The team's head coach was Les Miles, who entered his fourth year at the helm. They played their home games at Tiger Stadium in Baton Rouge, Louisiana. The Tigers entered the season as defending national champions, having defeated Ohio State, 38–24, in the 2008 BCS National Championship Game.

Previous season

In his third season as head coach, Les Miles led LSU to the 2007 SEC Championship and the 2007 NCAA Division I-FBS national football championship.  The Tigers became the first team to win two championships in the Bowl Championship Series era (1998–2013) and also the first 2-loss team to win a national championship, even though no games were lost in regulation.  The team finished with a final record of 12–2.

The team overcame 2 triple-overtime losses and four other close games to become the first two-time Bowl Championship Series (BCS) champion ever.  On their way to the BCS championship, the Tigers won their tenth Southeastern Conference championship by defeating Tennessee in the 2007 SEC Championship Game.

The Tigers finished the season having earned the Southeastern Conference championship trophy, the Grantland Rice Award, the MacArthur Bowl National Championship trophy, the Associated Press Trophy and the AFCA National Championship Trophy.

Pre-season
In February, the NCAA granted defensive end Kirston Pittman a sixth-year of eligibility.  Pittman had missed the 2005 and 2006 seasons with foot and ankle injuries.

Coaching changes
Defensive coordinator Bo Pelini left to become the head coach at Nebraska.

2008 recruiting class

Key losses
Offense
Matt Flynn, QB Drafted by the Green Bay Packers in the seventh round (209th overall) of the 2008 NFL Draft.
Jacob Hester, FB/RB Drafted by the San Diego Chargers in the third round (69th overall) of the 2008 NFL Draft.
Early Doucet, WR Drafted by the Arizona Cardinals in the third round (81st overall) of the 2008 NFL Draft.
Ryan Perrilloux Dismissed from team February 18, 2008; team policy violations.

Defense
Glenn Dorsey, DT Drafted by the Kansas City Chiefs fifth overall in the 2008 NFL Draft.
Craig Steltz, SS Drafted by the Chicago Bears in the fourth round (120th overall) of the 2008 NFL Draft.
Ali Highsmith, LB Signed with the Arizona Cardinals as a rookie free-agent for a two-year deal.

Schedule

Denotes the largest crowd to watch a football game at Tiger Stadium

Schedule Source: 2008 LSU Tigers football schedule

Rankings

Game summaries

Appalachian State

North Texas

Auburn

Mississippi State

Florida

South Carolina

Georgia

Tulane

Alabama

Troy
Game delayed due to effects from Hurricane Gustav from originally scheduled date of September 6.

Trailing 31–3 midway through the third quarter, the Bayou Bengals stage the greatest comeback in LSU history, even surpassing their fabled 1959 Halloween Night Billy Cannon-led rally against Ole Miss, scoring 37 consecutive points and rally for a 40–31 win.

Ole Miss

Arkansas

Chick-fil-A Bowl

A 28-point 2nd quarter by LSU was too much for the Yellow Jackets to overcome in the 2008 Chick-fil-A Bowl rout. Georgia Tech gave up three turnovers and did not force any.

Statistics

Team

Scores by quarter

Offense

Rushing

Passing

Receiving

Defense

Special teams

Roster

2008 Louisiana State University Football Roster and Bios http://www.lsusports.net/SportSelect.dbml?SPSID=27812&SPID=2164&DB_LANG=C&DB_OEM_ID=5200&SORT_ORDER=6&Q_SEASON=2008

Coaching staff

LSU Tigers in the 2009 National Football League Draft 

https://www.pro-football-reference.com/draft/2009.htm

References

LSU
LSU Tigers football seasons
Peach Bowl champion seasons
LSU Tigers football